Kuzinellus is a genus of mites in the Phytoseiidae family.

Species

 Kuzinellus acanthus (van der Merwe, 1968)
 Kuzinellus additionalis Kolodochka, 1993
 Kuzinellus aditus (Parvez, Chaudhri & Ashfaq, 1994)
 Kuzinellus andreae
 Kuzinellus blairi (McMurtry & Moraes, 1991)
 Kuzinellus bregetovae (Wainstein & Beglyarov, 1972)
 Kuzinellus ecclesiasticus (De Leon, 1958)
 Kuzinellus elhariri (Bayan, 1988)
 Kuzinellus febriculus (Ueckermann & Loots, 1984)
 Kuzinellus ignavus (Chaudhri, Akbar & Rassol, 1974)
 Kuzinellus kuzini (Wainstein, 1962)
 Kuzinellus loricatus Wainstein, 1978
 Kuzinellus meritus (Parvez, Chaudhri & Ashfaq, 1994)
 Kuzinellus neosentus (van der Merwe, 1968)
 Kuzinellus neosoleiger (Gupta, 1981)
 Kuzinellus niloticus (El-Badry, 1967)
 Kuzinellus obsis (Ueckermann & Loots, 1988)
 Kuzinellus operantis (Chaudhri, Akbar & Rassol, 1974)
 Kuzinellus parvus (Denmark & Matthysse, in Matthysse & Denmark 1981)
 Kuzinellus prunusus (van der Merwe, 1968)
 Kuzinellus querellus (Ueckermann & Loots, 1988)
 Kuzinellus relentus (Denmark & Matthysse, in Matthysse & Denmark 1981)
 Kuzinellus saharae McMurtry & Bounfour, 1989
 Kuzinellus scytinus (Chazeau, 1970)
 Kuzinellus sennarensis (El-Badry, 1967)
 Kuzinellus sentus (Pritchard & Baker, 1962)
 Kuzinellus sursum (Parvez, Chaudhri & Ashfaq, 1994)
 Kuzinellus torulosus Kuznetsov, 1994
 Kuzinellus trisetus (Wu, Lan & Zhang, 1992)
 Kuzinellus vitreus (Chaudhri, Akbar & Rassol, 1974)
 Kuzinellus wentzeli (Ueckermann & Loots, 1988)
 Kuzinellus yokogawae (Ehara & Hamaoka, 1980)

References

Phytoseiidae